Michael Smith House is a historic home located near Cedarville, Braxton County, West Virginia. The original section, measuring 22 feet by 19 feet, was built in 1848, and constructed of large hand-hewn logs supported by a foundation of rock pillars spaced about ten feet apart.  In 1878, a log addition, 18 feet by 19 feet, was added to the west end of the log house.  The house has a six-foot porch across the entire front.  The house was built as part of a settlement of German immigrants.

It was listed on the National Register of Historic Places in 2006.

References

Houses on the National Register of Historic Places in West Virginia
Houses completed in 1848
Houses in Braxton County, West Virginia
National Register of Historic Places in Braxton County, West Virginia
Log buildings and structures on the National Register of Historic Places in West Virginia